The Purpose World Tour was the third concert tour by Canadian singer Justin Bieber, in support of his fourth studio album Purpose (2015). The tour started on March 9, 2016, in Seattle, Washington, and concluded on July 2, 2017, in London, United Kingdom. After that, the remaining 14 shows of the tour were cancelled due to Bieber's mental health issues.

According to Pollstar, Purpose World Tour grossed $163.3 million and sold 1,761,642 tickets in 2016 and the 29 shows in 2017 grossed $93.7 million with 1,043,839 tickets sold. Overall, the tour had a total gross of $257 million and 2,805,481 in attendance in 141 shows, becoming one of the highest-grossing concert tours of both 2016 and 2017.

Background

The tour was announced on November 11, 2015, on The Ellen DeGeneres Show. That same day, 58 dates in the United States along Canada were revealed on the singer's website. Due to overwhelming demand, additional shows were added in several cities. On September 30, 2016, Bieber announced that tour dates for New Zealand and Australia were to be released the following week. On October 25, 2016, two tour dates were announced for Mexico, as well as the South American and Central American legs of the tour. On December 5, 2016, Bieber announced on The Ellen DeGeneres Show he would be starting a stadium tour starting in Australia and continue throughout the year in 2017, with dates announced later that day.

Concert synopsis 
The show starts with a pre-recorded sequence in which he is "stuck inside a glass cube; then the real Bieber appeared inside a real cube" performing "Mark My Words", scrawling words like "hope" on the walls with a marker, while wearing a long white coat. Later, Bieber rises from below the stage in a large glass cube, "with the hydraulics pushing him higher" during the performance of "Where Are Ü Now", with holograms flashing about, while "Bieber's crew of dancers tumbled onstage in all-white attire as women suspended in midair did acrobatics against a chrome-y, industrial video backdrop." For "I'll Show You", Bieber is "trapped under a literal steel cage while firestorms and spinning whirlwinds engulf him." During the song's chorus, "an LED light show began flashing across its beams, covering him in exploding octagons and digital fireworks." During "The Feeling", acrobats twirled above him, while cosmic projections of Halsey are shown. Later, the performance of "Get Used To It" brought pyrotechnics, as well as movement from the platforms onstage.

The performance of "Love Yourself" has Bieber on acoustic guitar while seated on a red velvet couch down center stage. Later, the acoustic break also continued with a breezy solo rendition of "Home to Mama" and a new song called "Insecurities". After the acoustic set, "Boyfriend" is performed, with dancers in LED-laden black bodysuits creating "a light show" in choreography. Later, "Been You" is performed by Bieber and his dancers, featuring a "dance break", while in "Company", "a hidden platform anchored to the ceiling begins to descend and it turned out to be a giant, suspended trampoline, on which Justin completed a couple of backflips." "No Sense" is followed by the performance of "Hold Tight" and "No Pressure". The performance of "As Long As You Love Me", having a hard electric guitar riffs. Later, Bieber introduced his own act-two drum solo. Wearing a Marilyn Manson T-shirt, he "cheerily introduces and hugs elementary school-aged dancers" during the "Children" performance, which is followed by "Life Is Worth Living", where Bieber is backed by couples in stark white doing a contemporary choreography. In "What Do You Mean?", dancers on skateboards circled the singer, who by then had changed into a pair of joggers emblazoned with the Purpose tour logo. The performance of "Baby" was considered "playful", by Dylan Rupert of Billboard and later he performs "Purpose" at a white grand piano, The concert finishes with "Sorry", where Bieber stood with his dancers beneath a shower of artificial rain.

Critical reception 

NME'''s Luke Morgan Britton named the tour as one of the best live shows of 2016, writing: "It was grandiose, self-indulgent, erratic and, when he could be bothered, had some of the best live singing you'll see. The 'Purpose' tour was like the life of a tortured pop star as performance art." Dylan Rupert of Billboard praised Bieber's vocals for sounding "smooth as ever", while noting that the performance of "Company" was "one of the show's most thrilling (though slightly puzzling) moments" and praising the acoustic set. Marc Snetiker of Entertainment Weekly called it "a concert that shows, beyond a shadow of a doubt, that Bieber is back. [...] Bieber had to prove that his comeback tour is exactly that — a performer's return to top form, not just a fluke of well-produced singles and hooks. That unfortunate weight did seem to bear down on Bieber during the entire show — he brought out no special guests and remained solemn throughout the night — but over time, its heft will diminish." Andrew Matson of Rolling Stone offered a very positive review, declaring: "The concert was sublime vocally, visually and musically, Bieber and his scaled back band did justice to songs in a cavernous space, often elevating the material." [...] "Bieber sang for real, played the piano, acoustic guitar and rock drums all gracefully and danced with zero mistakes. Sure, his energy seemed tentative as his dancers did Matrix capoeira all around him, but the Purpose tour is off to a stellar start, showcasing a musician taking control of his art and an audience vibing along for his journey."

Mikael Wood of Los Angeles Times wrote about Bieber performance, stating: "His face expressionless, he sang with focused intensity — especially in "Hold Tight" and "Life Is Worth Living" — and danced in a powerfully unself-conscious way, as though he were simply a guy trying out moves for his own enjoyment." For Owen R. Smith of Seattle Times, "Nothing could topple the positive quality of the evening overall." Chris Macias of The Sacramento Bee noted that "[F]or all the spectacle, and the occasional lifting of his garments to show off those abs, the Biebs is a bit tentative as a performer." François Marchand of Vancouver Sun analysed the tour, stating: "But all in all it was entertaining and the songs on Purpose are excellent – smooth and steady, atmospheric and deep." Tony Hicks of Mercury News was mixed, noting that "while the visuals were impressive, they masked the fact that Bieber's voice sounded muffled most of the night. [...] He does deserve credit for being in control all night. But that comes at a cost. Until his hair became out of sorts, there wasn't a second that didn't feel scripted, including stints of our hero showing off his musicianship by performing with an acoustic guitar and doing a comically pedestrian drum solo."

In less favorable reviews, Adam Graham from The Detroit News noted the singer "sleep-walked through his choreography, made no attempts to mask his pre-recorded vocals and performed with the enthusiasm of a teenager being forced to clean his room." Jim Louvau of Phoenix New Times wrote: "You'd think that he'd show at least a perfunctory level of joy while performing on stage in front of thousands of ticket-buying fans, but at least outwardly, that was not the case." For MLive, Edward Pevos noted: "When Bieber was dancing, he wasn't singing much. He was also a bit unenthusiastic. It was as if he just wanted to get through the show at times. The microphone was often no where near his mouth while the backing tracks were playing."

Purpose World Tour's Mumbai leg saw an attendance of 60,000 making it one of the highest selling Indian concerts by an English-language artist, eclipsed only by Michael Jackson.

Set list
This set list is representative of the show on March 9, 2016, in Seattle. It is not representative of all concerts for the duration of the tour.

 "Mark My Words"
 "Where Are Ü Now"
 "Get Used to It"
 "I'll Show You"
 "The Feeling"
 "Boyfriend"
 "Home to Mama" / "Cold Water"
 "Love Yourself"
 "Been You"
 "Company"
 "No Sense"
 "Hold Tight"
 "No Pressure"
 "As Long As You Love Me 
 "Children"
 "Let Me Love You" (Added at the European 1st leg)
 "Life is Worth Living"
 "What Do You Mean?"
 "Baby"
 "Purpose"
 "Sorry"

Shows

Cancelled shows

See also 
 List of highest-grossing concert tours

Notes

References

2016 concert tours
2017 concert tours
Justin Bieber concert tours